Žarko Lučić (Montenegrin Cyrillic: Жарко Лучић; born 14 December 1968) is a Montenegrin former footballer who played as a goalkeeper and made five appearances for the FR Yugoslavia national team. During his career, on numerous occasions he scored as a goalkeeper, with the IFFHS attributing him with having scored 21 goals. After retiring from his playing career, he worked as a goalkeeping coach, most recently at Rudar Pljevlja.

International career
Lučić made his international debut for FR Yugoslavia on 15 November 2000 in a friendly match against Romania, which finished as a 1–2 away loss. He made five appearances in total for the team, earning his final cap on 25 January 2001 in the Millennium Super Soccer Cup against Bosnia and Herzegovina, which finished as a 2–0 win.

Career statistics

International

References

External links
 
 
 
 
 

1968 births
Living people
Sportspeople from Pljevlja
Association football goalkeepers
Serbia and Montenegro footballers
Serbia and Montenegro international footballers
Montenegrin footballers
FK Rudar Pljevlja players
FK Lovćen players
FK Budućnost Podgorica players
FC Torpedo Moscow players
FK Kom players
OFK Titograd players
FK Slavija Sarajevo players
First League of Serbia and Montenegro players
Second League of Serbia and Montenegro players
Montenegrin Republic League players
Montenegrin First League players
Premier League of Bosnia and Herzegovina players
Serbia and Montenegro expatriate footballers
Expatriate footballers in Russia
Serbia and Montenegro expatriate sportspeople in Russia
Montenegrin expatriate footballers
Expatriate footballers in Bosnia and Herzegovina
Montenegrin expatriate sportspeople in Bosnia and Herzegovina
Association football goalkeeping coaches